The Philippine Senate Committee on Government Corporations and Public Enterprises is a standing committee of the Senate of the Philippines.

Jurisdiction 
According to the Rules of the Senate, the committee handles all matters relating to:

 Government corporations, including all amendments to their charters
 Interests of the government in the different industrial and commercial enterprises
 Privatization

Members, 18th Congress 
Based on the Rules of the Senate, the Senate Committee on Government Corporations and Public Enterprises has 9 members.

The President Pro Tempore, the Majority Floor Leader, and the Minority Floor Leader are ex officio members.

Here are the members of the committee in the 18th Congress as of September 24, 2020:

Committee secretary: Eleuteria M. Mirasol

See also 

 List of Philippine Senate committees

References 

Government